Hosabettu is a census town in Manjeshwar Grama Panchayat of Kasaragod district in Kerala state, India.

Demographics
As per 2011 Census, Hosabettu census town with an area of  had total population of 5,179 where 2,591 are males and 2,588 are females. The sex ratio is 999 women per 1000 men. Population of children in the age group 0-6 is 562 which is 10.9% of total population. Total number of households is 666 in the town limits. 
Hosabettu town has overall literacy rate of 88.9% where male literacy stands at 92.7% and female literacy at 85.2%.

Religions
Hosabettu town has 62.6% Muslims, 32.6% Hindus, 4.7% Christians and 0.1% Others.

Administration
This village is part of Manjeshwar (State Assembly constituency) which belongs to Kasaragod (Lok Sabha constituency).

References

Manjeshwar area
Cities and towns in Kasaragod district